Sabrina Louise Bernstein, better known by her stage name Sizzy Rocket, is an American musician, singer, and songwriter. In 2016, she released her debut album, Thrills, and toured the record nationwide as direct support for Kitten. In the same year she started her first independent record label Diet Punk Records, now Lost Chrrry Records. On this new label, Rocket collaborated with The KickDrums to create a punk rock band called Shiny Wet Machine.

Rocket was raised in Las Vegas, Nevada and knew that she wanted to be a performer from the age of 7. In high school, she threw herself into her studies and ultimately graduated the valedictorian of her class at Las Vegas Academy. While living in Las Vegas, she performed at the city's Bite of LV Festival, House of Blues, and opened for Imagine Dragons. She was also a semi-finalist on the NBC reality television show America's Got Talent.

After finishing high school, Rocket moved to New York to attend New York University's Clive Davis School of Music. She attended for three years before leaving the program to further pursue her career. Her work with various producers lead to a publishing deal with Universal, where she has since written with artists including Flosstradamus. A collaboration titled “Don’t Trip,” was featured on Flosstradamus’ EP Soundclash with Run The Jewels. In 2016 she released her debut full-length album THRILLS via independent record label Yebo Music. The lead single, "Bestie" received polarizing press, with PAPER Magazine calling it a “biting girl-on-girl anthem".

On June 14, 2019, Rocket independently released her second album Grrrl.

On September 25, 2020, Rocket released her third album ANARCHY. On December 15, 2020, she performed hit tracks from the album, including Spill My Guts and Smells Like Sex during a live-streamed concert entitled "ANARCHY: Come To Life" presented in collaboration with Moment House.

On March 26, 2021, Rocket released The Bitch EP, which included collaborations with UPSAHL and Mothica.

Discography

Albums 

Thrills (2016)
 Grrrl (2019)
 ANARCHY (2020)
 Live Laugh Love (2022)

Mixtapes 
 Hot Summer (2017)
 Too Young To Die (2021)

Extended plays 
30,000 ft (2011)
Mulholland (2018)

Singles 
 "Kingpin" (2015)
 "Queen" (Perfume Genius cover) (2015)
 "Dope" (2017) 
 "Still" (2017)
 "Amphetamine" (2017)
 "Mulholland" (2018)
"Real Life (Remix)" (2018)
 "High" (2018)
 "Harley" (2018)
 "Juicy Fruit" (2018)
 "SID VICIOUS" (2019)
 "DANG" (2019)
"Grrrl: Punk Sessions - Single" (2019)
"I KNOW WHAT U LIKE" (2019)
 "That Bitch" (2020)
 "Smells Like Sex" (2020)
 "Rollerskating" (2020)
 "Spill My Guts" (2020)
"American Rage" (2021)
"The World Is Burning" (2021)

Other projects 
 Shiny Wet Machine (2016–present)

References

American singer-songwriters
1992 births
Living people